How to Train Your Dragon: Music from the Motion Picture is a soundtrack album composed by John Powell for the film of the same name and released by Varèse Sarabande on March 23, 2010. The score earned Powell his first Academy Award nomination and his third BAFTA nomination, which he lost to The Social Network and The King's Speech, respectively. The score also won the International Film Music Critics Association 2011 Awards for Best Original Score for an Animated Feature and Film Score of the Year, and was nominated twice for Film Music Composition of the Year for the tracks "Forbidden Friendship" and "Test Drive". The soundtrack received wide acclaim from professional music critics.

Background 
How to Train Your Dragon was composer John Powell's sixth collaboration with DreamWorks Animation. Powell had scored many of DreamWorks' previous films, but this was the first of DreamWorks' films where Powell helmed the score on his own (on his previous efforts with DreamWorks, he had collaborated with other composers such as Harry Gregson-Williams and Hans Zimmer). Zimmer had long praised Powell's abilities, and on many occasions, asserted that he was the superior composer between them, thus firmly supporting Powell's solo animation effort.

Icelandic singer Jónsi was brought on to write and record the song "Sticks & Stones", which plays during the end credits of the film. Director Dean DeBlois had previously worked with Jónsi before, directing a concert film for his band Sigur Rós entitled Heima, and a companion film for his album Go entitled Go Quiet.

In an interview with The Wrap'''s Steve Pond, Powell talked about his intent for the score:

 Composition 

The score has traditional Scottish influences, and uses instruments such as the fiddle, bagpipes, uilleann pipes, Great Irish warpipes and pennywhistle. The soundtrack is 79 minutes long.

 Orchestration 

The instrumentation of the score includes 3 flutes, 3 oboes, 3 clarinets, 3 bassoons, 12 French horns, 4 trumpets, 6 trombones, tuba, timpani, 8 percussionists, 2 harps, piano doubling celeste, SATB choir, and a string section of 30 violins, 12 violas, 10 cellos and 8 double basses. Woodwind players also double on piccolo, english horn, bass and contrabass clarinets, and contrabassoon. Other instruments used include the sopilka and Irish flute, hammered dulcimer, gadulka, esraj, yaylı tambur, hurdy-gurdy, accordion, harmonium, Hardanger fiddle, acoustic and electric guitar, and the aforementioned fiddle, bagpipes, uilleann pipes, warpipes and pennywhistle.

The score calls for over 30 percussion instruments. Drums include 5 snare drums of various types, 4 bass drums, 2 goblet drums, 2 surdos, a "small low drum", repinique, a dhol, various brekete, and concert tom-toms; pitched instruments include a glockenspiel, vibraphone, chimes, crotales, marimba, bass marimba, 3 slate marimbas, and 2 glass marimbas. Other percussion used include various cymbals, 4 gongs, an anvil, 2 sleigh bells, tambourine, mark tree, triangle, 2 shakers, garbage cans, and a pot.

 Musical themes 

Powell states that he "presents almost all his themes within the first five minutes of the film". "Hiccup's Theme" is introduced immediately in the film version of "This is Berk", played by brass; this theme is often accompanied by an eighth note ostinato (Toothless' Theme), for example shortly into "Test Drive". "The Vikings Theme" is introduced shortly thereafter, played by a solo bassoon, after which a second interpretation of Hiccup's theme is played by wind instruments.

About one minute into the original opening version of "This is Berk", the music modulates via fast triplet arpeggios into the "warring Vikings" theme, which has Scottish influences. At about 3:15, the "fun Vikings" theme is first introduced on solo clarinet backed by pizzicato strings. Warpipes introduce the "dragon tune" around 4:15, which is played by low brass.

 Critical reception 

The score was exceptionally well-received, earning universal praise from professional film score critics and fans alike. Powell earned a BAFTA nomination for his work as well as his first Oscar nomination, losing both nominations to Alexandre Desplat for his score for The King's Speech and to Trent Reznor and Atticus Ross for their score for The Social Network, respectively. The music also won an Annie Award for the Best Music in a Feature Production from the International Animated Film Association, ASIFA-Hollywood.

Christian Clemmensen, founder of Filmtracks.com and member of the IFMCA, praised the score, saying that "Powell has finally managed to create a well rounded and more easily digestible variation on his typical mannerisms for How to Train Your Dragon." He however criticized the use of Scottish and Irish tones in a score meant for Vikings, as well as the Jónsi song "Sticks & Stones", which he felt "[drained] all the enthusiasm out of the environment created by Powell." However, Clemmensen still awarded the score the highest rating of five stars, and later listed the score as one of the Top Five of the year.

Other reviewers expressed similar opinions about the score. Jonathan Broxton, founder of Movie Music UK and another member of the IFMCA said: "It’s very rare that one can listen to an entire 70+ minute album and honestly say that all of them have musical merit, but that is genuinely the case here. Usually scores of this length have a fair amount of filler, […] but on How to Train Your Dragon every cue has worth."  Archie Watt from MovieCues'' said: "I sincerely hope that Powell’s work will be rewarded with an Oscar in 2011. It couldn’t be more deserved—the score is by far the best of the year to date, and I can’t foresee any other score taking that accolade from this masterpiece."  Both reviewers named it as the Best Score of the Year.

British dressage rider Charlotte Dujardin prominently used music from the soundtrack for her Grand Prix Freestyle performances with her gelding Valegro. They also set the Freestyle World Record using the music at the Olympia London International Horse Show 2014.

Awards and nominations

Track listing

Deluxe Edition CD 1 Track listing

Deluxe Edition CD 2 Track listing

References

Citations

Books

External links 
 

How to Train Your Dragon
2010 soundtrack albums
2010s film soundtrack albums
John Powell (film composer) soundtracks
Varèse Sarabande soundtracks
Action film soundtracks
Fantasy film soundtracks